Vančo "Vane" Stojanov (Macedonian: Ванчо "Ване" Стојанов; born 11 September 1977 in Strumica) is a Macedonian former middle-distance runner who specialised in the 800 metres. He represented his country at the 2000 and 2004 Summer Olympics as well as two World Championships.

International competitions

Personal bests
Outdoor
400 metres – 49.49 (Sofia 2003)
800 metres – 1:47.14 (Sofia 2002)
1000 metres – 2:32.08 (Skopje 1998)
1500 metres – 3:45.97 (Sofia 2001)
Indoor
400 metres – 48.90 (Sofia 2003)
800 metres – 1:49.36 (Sofia 2003)
1500 metres – 3:51.13 (Piraeus 1997)

References

1977 births
Living people
Macedonian male middle-distance runners
World Athletics Championships athletes for North Macedonia
Olympic athletes of North Macedonia
Athletes (track and field) at the 2000 Summer Olympics
Athletes (track and field) at the 2004 Summer Olympics
People from Strumica Municipality